Landriano is a comune (municipality) in the Province of Pavia in the Italian region Lombardy, located about  southeast of Milan and about  northeast of Pavia.

Landriano borders the following municipalities: Bascapè, Carpiano, Siziano, Torrevecchia Pia and Vidigulfo. It is located on the left shore of the Lambro, which here forms an islet which is the site of the old town's castle.

In 1529 it was the location of the battle of Landriano between France and Spain.

References

External links
 Official website

Cities and towns in Lombardy